"Only Lonely" is a song by American rock band Bon Jovi. It was the first single taken from their second album, 7800° Fahrenheit (1985).

Reception
Cash Box called it "a more textured and more melodic effort than the band’s past material."

Debuting on the Hot 100 on April 20, 1985, it peaked at #54 and remained on the charts for eight weeks.  The song fared better on the Mainstream Rock Tracks chart, where it peaked at #28 in May.

Background
"Only Lonely" was played in the 1987 drama film Light of Day starring Michael J. Fox, Gena Rowlands, Joan Jett and Michael McKean.

"Only Lonely" was performed as a part of the encore in Bon Jovi's March 24, 2010 Circle Tour concert in Philadelphia.

Track listing

Chart performance

References 

Bon Jovi songs
1985 songs
Songs written by David Bryan
Songs written by Jon Bon Jovi
PolyGram singles